The , formally known as Marseille Hockey Club, are an ice hockey club based in Marseille, Bouches-du-Rhône, France. They are the 2020–21 Division 1 (second tier) champions, but were not promoted to the Ligue Magnus as promotions and relegations had been frozen due to the COVID-19 pandemic.

History
The club was established in April 2012 under the name Massilia Hockey Club —after Marseille's Latin name— to replace the city's historic Hockey Club Phocéen in the French Division 3 (fourth tier) league, when the latter pulled out of competition due to financial problems.

Successive promotions 
In 2014, France international Luc Tardif Jr. retired from the Ligue Magnus at age 29, following a string of injuries. Having gone through a coaching course during his time away from the ice, Tardif joined Marseille with an eye on a new career behind the bench, although he initially signed on as a player-coach, as the light Division 3 schedule allowed him to continue playing at an acceptable risk for the time being.

The club finished the 2014–15 season as Division 3 runner-up and gained promotion to Division 2. However it found it hard to compete at that level, narrowly avoiding relegation back to Division 3 in 2015–16. In reaction, Tardif retired from playing to focus on coaching full time, and the roster received a major overhaul, with most local players weeded out of the team in favor of recruits from more traditional hockey hotbeds.

In 2017, the organization changed its name from Massilia Hockey Club to Marseille Hockey Club. Meanwhile, a separate company was spun off from the amateur club to oversee the professionalization of its flagship team. Tardif was a founding minority shareholder as was his half-brother Jonathan Zwikel, who was also named president of the new entity. The team's main shareholder is Jean-Claude Menn, a Fribourg, Switzerland-based businessman.
 
Despite being eliminated by Toulouse-Blagnac in the quarterfinals of the 2018 Division 2 playoffs, Marseille was promoted to Division 1 as the only team willing to step up on short notice when the folding of Ligue Magnus team Gamyo d'Épinal created a domino effect that freed an additional promotion spot.

Division 1 champions 
Due to COVID-19, the 2020–21 Division 1 season was played under an abridged format, with two regional pools replacing the usual single conference setup, and a final four bringing together the two best teams from each pool in lieu of three-round, best-of-five playoffs.
Marseille finished second in the East pool, before upsetting favorites Nantes and defeating Strasbourg in the final four to claim the Division 1 championship. However, due to the competition's unconventional format, the French Ice Hockey Federation decided not to apply promotions and relegations for the 2020–21 season, forcing the club to compete in Division 1 again for the 2021–22 campaign.

Trophies and awards
 Division 1:
  (x1) 2021

References

External links
 Official website 

Sport in Marseille
Ice hockey teams in France
Ice hockey clubs established in 2012
2012 establishments in France